Pitcairnia curvidens is a plant species in the genus Pitcairnia. This species is native to Brazil.

References

curvidens
Flora of Brazil